Guru Nanak Institute of Dental Sciences and Research (GNIDSR) is a private dental college located in Panihati, Kolkata, in the Indian state of West Bengal. It is affiliated with the West Bengal University of Health Sciences and is recognised by Dental Council of India. It teaches Bachelor of Dental Science (BDS) and Master of Dental Science (MDS) courses.

Rankings 

The National Institutional Ranking Framework (NIRF) ranked Guru nanak Institute of Dental Sciences & Research 40th in  Dental ranking in India.

References

Dental colleges in India
Universities and colleges in North 24 Parganas district
Affiliates of West Bengal University of Health Sciences
Educational institutions established in 2003
2003 establishments in West Bengal